David Ian (born David Ian Lane; February 1961) is a British  theatre producer and former actor.

Biography

Ian started out as an actor and appeared in a number of UK theatre productions, including the musicals The Pirates of Penzance, Joseph and the Amazing Technicolor Dreamcoat, and The Rocky Horror Show. He is known professionally as David Ian as the name David Lane was already taken when he applied to the actors union Equity.

As a singer, Ian twice attempted to represent the UK at the Eurovision Song Contest, taking part in both the 1984 and 1986 A Song for Europe competitions on BBC1 as a member of the bands First Division and Jump respectively. Both songs were written by Paul Curtis.

In 1990 David met fellow actor Paul Nicholas while they were both appearing in a production of The Pirates of Penzance at the London Palladium. The pair created a production company, Paul Nicholas & David Ian Associates Ltd.

Productions
Ian's productions include:
 Jesus Christ Superstar 
 Grease 
 Rocky Horror Show 
 Ain’t Misbehavin 
 Singin’ in the Rain 
 Evita 
 Chess 
 Happy Days  
 Saturday Night Fever 
 West Side Story
 Pirates of Penzance

Producer

In 2006, he founded David Ian Productions, based in London's Covent Garden. It is now of the UK's premier producers of live large scale theatrical entertainment. Prior to founding DIP, he was Chairman/CEO of the global theatrical division of Live Nation (from 2005) having joined the group when it was part of Clear Channel Entertainment (in 2000).

At Live Nation, he was responsible for Broadway Across America, which produces and tours first class Broadway shows in over 40 markets in the United States and Canada. He was simultaneously CEO of the UK division which included over 25 theatres both in London’s West End and the majority of the regional markets in the UK.

How Do You Solve A Problem Like Maria?

In 2006, David Ian and Andrew Lloyd Webber agreed to co-produce a production of The Sound of Music. Together with the BBC they created the original TV casting show How Do You Solve a Problem like Maria?, hosted by Graham Norton. Ian, along with Lloyd Webber, was a judge on the programme. The TV show was a resounding success and led to the launch of The Sound of Music as a smash hit, starring Connie Fisher at the London Palladium.

References

1961 births
Living people
People from Chadwell Heath
English male stage actors
People educated at Ilford County High School
English theatre managers and producers
Date of birth missing (living people)